Operation Antiquity is one of a series of operations by U.S. federal law enforcement agencies to investigate the smuggling of ancient artifacts from Thailand to the United States since 2002. After several years of secrecy, the case was uncovered on January 24, 2008 by federal law enforcement officers who raided multiple museums, shops, warehouses, and the homes of private art collectors and made headlines in several international media at the time. news.

The case involved a criminal group that smuggled ancient relics from Thailand to the United States, as well as a scandal in which several museums in California accepted donations even though they knew about the smuggling. More than 10,000 looted cultural relics were seized in this case, many of them from the Ban Chiang archaeological site. It later facilitated the repatriation of large numbers of artifacts to Thailand and set higher standards of accountability for museum officials who deal with cultural property.

Background
The main suspect in the case, Robert Olson, started smuggling after coming into contact with antiquities during a trip to Thailand in the 1970s. He buys antiquities from a Thai middleman, Marc Pettibone, which he then sells to museums across California for a profit. Pettibone, an American living in Thailand, collected ancient artifacts for Olsen from all over Thailand, and assisted in bribing customs for the smooth transportation of artifacts to the United States. Olson's regulars include Beverly Hills home improvement stores and private art galleries such as the Silk Road Gallery. After a criminal syndicate smuggled ancient artifacts into the United States, art galleries took the lead in finding people who needed tax deductions and providing appraisers services, multiplying the price of artifacts obtained from Thailand as the appraised value, and then adding them Donate to a museum to receive a tax deduction for art donations. It is said that there are more cultural relics in American museums than excavations.

Detective
The FBI began to pay attention to this criminal group in 2002, launching a federal investigation program code-named "Operation Antiquity", arranging for a National Park Service agent to pretend to be a private collector to collect money from two art dealers has repeatedly purchased ancient artifacts looted from Thailand and donated them to several California art museums. Agents discovered that the directors of these museums had some level of knowledge about the origins of the ancient artifacts, and agreed to accept donations.

The case was uncovered on January 24, 2008, when federal law enforcement officers divided 13 roads and raided multiple museums, shops, warehouses and homes of private art collectors in California and Chicago. Shocking to all walks of life is the scandal that many museums in California still accept donations even when they know the inside story of smuggling. The investigation uncovered a large number of ancient artifacts from Ban Chiang and other prehistoric sites in Thailand that were collected by at least five California museums, including the Los Angeles County Museum of Art, Museum of International Folk Art, USC Pacific Asia Museum, Bowers Museum, Berkeley Art Museum and Pacific Film Archive. Dr. Joyce White assisted the U.S. government as an expert witness in identifying more than 10,000 artifacts belonging to Ban Ching and related prehistoric cultural objects.

Robert Olsen was arraigned in 2013 but pleaded not guilty. The trial was expected to take place in November 2016, but Olson's ill health delayed several times until his plea was withdrawn after his death in May 2017. Roxanna Brown, director of the Southeast Asian Ceramics Museum at Bangkok University, originally assisted the prosecution in investigating the case, but the prosecution later found out that Brown and Olsen had a close relationship and had emails exchanged between the two parties: which Brown allowed Olson used her electronic signature as proof of the museum's donation, and Olson promised to pay Brown an honorarium. The prosecution changed Brown from a witness to a suspect, and Brown was arrested in Seattle on May 9, 2008, but Brown died in the detention center five days later. Mark Pettibone was indicted by U.S. prosecutors in 2012, but could not be extradited to the U.S. for trial.

In contrast to the high-profile search operation in January 2008, the prosecution's investigation stagnated in the following years, and no museum officials or collectors were prosecuted. However, the case still has partial results. Jonathan and Cari Markell, the owners of Silk Road Gallery, pleaded guilty to the charges in 2015. Jonathan was sentenced to 18 months in prison and one year of supervised probation for trafficking in looted antiquities and forged documents; Jonathan and Carrie were each sentenced to three years of unsupervised probation. In addition, they had to pay a fine of about $2,000 for the return of 337 artifacts from their homes and seized galleries to Southeast Asia, totaling about $25,000.

Return
Some museums found to be holding smuggled artifacts have returned them to Thailand: in October 2014, the Bowers Museum returned 542 artifacts to Thailand, and Museum of International Folk Art returned 68 artifacts, which museums avoided by returning artifacts. was prosecuted. The Bangkok Post reported that, thanks to the hard work of the Thai and American authorities, the ancient relics looted from the archaeological site have been returned, and the Thai government welcomes the repatriation of these relics. This case is of great significance in the United States, mainly for two reasons: First, this is an investigation led by the U.S. federal government, not initiated by a complaint from a foreign government. Second, The US government sets a higher standard of accountability for museum officials who deal with cultural property according National Stolen Property Act and Archaeological Resources Protection Act of 1979.

References

2008 crimes in the United States
Thailand–United States relations
Art and cultural repatriation
Archaeological theft
Archaeology of Thailand